Eugenia Grandet (also known as Eugenie Grandet) is a 1946 Italian historical drama film directed by Mario Soldati. It is based on the 1833 novel Eugénie Grandet by Honoré de Balzac. The novel has been adapted into films on a number of occasions. The film's sets were designed by art director Gastone Medin.

The film entered the competition at the 7th Venice International Film Festival.  For her performance Alida Valli won the Nastro d'Argento for Best Actress. The film also won the Nastro d'Argento for Best Scenography.

Plot

Cast 
Alida Valli: Eugenia Grandet
Giorgio De Lullo: Charles Grandet
Gualtiero Tumiati: Felix Grandet
Giuditta Rissone: Eugenia's mother
Maria Bodi: Madame Des Grassins
Giuseppe Varni: Mr. Des Grassins 
Pina Gallini: Nanon
Lina Gennari: Marquise D'Aubrion 
Enzo Biliotti: Notary Cruchet 
Liana Del Balzo

References

External links

1946 films
Italian historical drama films
Films directed by Mario Soldati
1940s historical drama films
Films based on Eugénie Grandet
Films set in the 19th century
Italian black-and-white films
Minerva Film films
1946 drama films
Films scored by Renzo Rossellini
1940s Italian films
1940s Italian-language films